Joshua Daniel Brizell (born 15 October 1991) is an English footballer who plays as a defender or midfielder for Litherland REMYCA.

He started his career in the youth teams at Rochdale, captaining both the youth and reserve sides before working his way into the first team. He joined Hyde in 2011, and was sent out on loan to Ossett Town later the same year. He featured as a first-team regular for Hyde after his return.

Career

Rochdale
Born in Liverpool, Brizell came through the ranks at Rochdale and captained both the youth side and reserve side, before making his debut for the first team on 11 August 2009, coming on as a second-half substitute for Marcus Holness in a 3–0 League Cup defeat at Sheffield Wednesday.

Hyde
Following his release from Rochdale, he joined Conference North side Hyde on 14 October 2011. He joined Ossett Town on an emergency loan cover basis for one match in early November 2011, a 5–0 defeat away to Witton Town on 11 November 2011.

He returned to Hyde to make his debut for the club coming on as a second-half substitute in their 0–0 draw away at Hinckley United on 14 November 2011. He made his first start for the club less than a week later as part of a 3–2 home win over Colwyn Bay.
He finished his first season with Hyde having played 23 games in all competitions, scoring no goals, helping his side to the Conference North title for the 2011–12 season.

He signed a new deal at the club which would keep him at Hyde until the end of the 2012–13 season, he made his first appearance of that season on the opening day draw away at Braintree Town, Hyde first ever game in the Conference Premier. He scored his first goal for the club in March 2013, scoring the winner in a 2–1 win over Cambridge United at Ewen Fields. But just two games later he received the first red-card of his career for serious foul-play as his side drew 1–1 at Barrow. He finished his first full season with the club having played 40 times scoring one goal.

On 21 June 2013, Brizell signed a new one-year contract with Hyde. He received another red card in August 2013 on the opening day of the 2013–14 season, following a first-half tackle on Al Bangura as Hyde lost 8–0 at The New Lawn to Forest Green Rovers. He picked up his second red-card of the season in November for a late-tackle in Hyde's 4–0 defeat away at FC Halifax Town.

AFC Telford United
Brizell joined AFC Telford United, who had been newly relegated to the rebranded National League North, in June 2015. He broke his wrist during pre-season, and on return to fitness was not in the plans of new manager Rob Smith, who had replaced Steve Kittrick with Telford bottom of the league.

Marine
In July 2016 he signed for Marine.

Skelmersdale United
In March 2017 he joined Skelmersdale United.

Colwyn Bay
In August 2017 he joined Colwyn Bay.1

Runcorn Linnets
In August 2020 he joined Runcorn Linnets.

Prestatyn Town
He then joined Cymru North club Prestatyn Town in November 2020 but did not play a competitive game for the club as football remained suspended in Wales due the ongoing Covid-19 pandemic.

Liverpool NALGO
He made two appearances for the Liverpool County Premier League team Liverpool NALGO in spring 2021.

Ramsbottom United
In August 2021 he joined Ramsbottom United. He made no competitive appearances for the club.

Litherland REYMCA
In January 2022 he joined North West Counties Football League side Litherland REMYCA on non-contract terms.

Style of play
Brizell plays as a full-back, but he is just as comfortable attacking as he is defending.

Career statistics

Honours
Hyde
Conference North: 2011–12

References

External links

1991 births
Living people
Footballers from Liverpool
English footballers
Association football defenders
Rochdale A.F.C. players
Hyde United F.C. players
Ossett Town F.C. players
AFC Telford United players
Glossop North End A.F.C. players
Marine F.C. players
National League (English football) players
Northern Premier League players
Skelmersdale United F.C. players
Colwyn Bay F.C. players
Runcorn Linnets F.C. players
Prestatyn Town F.C. players
Ramsbottom United F.C. players
Litherland REMYCA F.C. players